Miss Hong Kong Pageant 2014 Final was held in TVB City on August 30, 2014. Ten delegates completed for the title. The winner was Veronica Shiu. The first runner-up was Erin Wong. The second runner-up was Katherine Ho. A week before Final, the Semi-Final was held in TVB City on August 24, 2014, which selected the top ten delegates from sixteen delegates to complete in the final.

Judging system

Semi-final
A week before Semi-final, viewers can start voting 1-3 delegates to eliminated from the competition via TVB fun app, the judges panel also selected 3 delegates to eliminated from the competition. The top 3 in viewers vote and the judges pick will foul in the semi-final.

Final
A week before Semi-final, viewers can start voting 1 delegates to be Miss Hong Kong 2014 via TVB fun app. In the final show, the judges panel will pick the top 3 to compete the title of Miss Hong Kong 2014. Viewers can determine who will be Miss Hong Kong 2014 among these 3 delegates.

Results

Placements

Votes in the Final

Total votes in the Final is 255,955

Eliminated

Special awards
Miss Photogenic: #15 Veronica Shiu
Miss Friendship: #15 Veronica Shiu
Miss Tourism Ambassador: #11 Sofiee Ng

Order of Announcement

Top 10
 9 Erin Wong
 12 Janet Choi
 11 Sofiee Ng
 3 Huynh, Linna
 1 Jan Tse
 15 Veronica Shiu
 5 CK Leung
 7 Katherine Ho
 13 Crystal Wong
 6 Yammi Lam

Top 3
 7 Katherine Ho
 15 Veronica Shiu
 9 Erin Wong

Contestant list

Withdrawal

Judges
Main Panel of Judges:
 Li Yundi
 Charmaine Sheh , Miss Hong Kong 1997 2nd runner-up
 Dr. Kennedy Wong
 Winnie Ng
 Bosco Wong

Miss Photogenic Judges:
 Janis Chan
 Toby Chan, Miss Hong Kong 2010
 Sammi Cheung, Miss Hong Kong 2010 1st runner-up
 Angel Chiang
 Jacquelin Ch'ng
 Tracy Chu, Miss Hong Kong 2012 2nd runner-up
 Selena Li, Miss Hong Kong 2003 Miss Photogenic
 Jennifer Shum, Miss Hong Kong 2012 Miss Photogenic
 Gloria Tang, Miss Chinese International 2013
 Natalie Tong
 Grace Wong, Miss Hong Kong 2007 1st runner-up
 Mandy Wong, Miss Hong Kong 2007 Top 5 Finalist
 Priscilla Wong
 Nancy Wu
 Elaine Yiu

Contestants notes
Veronica Shiu placed as 1st runner-up in Miss Chinese International Pageant 2015 in Hong Kong.
Erin Wong unplaced in Miss World 2014 in London, UK. She replaced Grace Chan, Miss Hong Kong 2013, when the new Miss Hong Kong was crowned
Katherine Ho unplaced in Miss International 2014 in Tokyo, Japan.
Janet Choi unplaced in Miss Grand International 2015 in Bangkok, Thailand. She was appointed as Miss Grand Hong Kong 2015 by Macau Pageant Alliance - HK Division.
Sabrina Yeung unplaced in Miss International 2015 in Tokyo, Japan. She was appointed as Miss International 2015 by Macau Pageant Alliance - HK Division after TVB lost the franchise.

References

Miss Hong Kong Pageants